Lyubomir Gutsev (born 18 March 1990) is a Bulgarian footballer who plays as a centre-back for Pirin Gotse Delchev.

Career

Club career
On 17 January 2020, Gutsev joined Kosovan club KF Flamurtari Prishtinë on a deal for six months with an extension option.

References

External links

1990 births
Living people
Bulgarian footballers
Bulgarian expatriate footballers
Association football defenders
PFC Pirin Gotse Delchev players
PFC Chernomorets Burgas players
FC Septemvri Simitli players
FC Tsarsko Selo Sofia players
FC Oborishte players
OFC Pirin Blagoevgrad players
KF Flamurtari players
First Professional Football League (Bulgaria) players
Football Superleague of Kosovo players
Bulgarian expatriate sportspeople in Kosovo
Expatriate footballers in Kosovo